Mano a Mano (Spanish for: Hand to Hand) is a compilation album released by the Mexican music ensembles Grupo Bryndis and Los Mismos.

Track listing

References

Grupo Bryndis albums
Los Mismos albums
1998 compilation albums